"All I Want Is You" is the debut single by American R&B recording artist Miguel released as the lead single from his debut album All I Want Is You (2010). The song features rapper J. Cole and was produced by Salaam Remi. The song was released as a digital download on May 25, 2010.

Charts

Weekly charts

Year-end charts

Certifications

Release history

Covers
Raheem DeVaughn has covered the song in 2015 with All I Want Is You (Remake).

References

2010 debut singles
J. Cole songs
Miguel (singer) songs
Songs written by J. Cole
Songs written by Miguel (singer)
Songs written by Salaam Remi
Song recordings produced by Salaam Remi
Jive Records singles

2010 singles
2010 songs